Golf, for the 2017 Island Games, was held at the Slite and Visby golf courses, Gotland, Sweden from 27 to 30 June 2017.

Medal table

Results

References

Island
2017
Golf